Gabriele Missaglia (born 24 July 1970 in Inzago) is an Italian former professional road bicycle racer.

Palmarès

1997
1st, Stage 11, Giro d'Italia
1st, Stage 1, Tour of the Basque Country
1998
1st, Overall, Tour de Langkawi
1999
1st, Stage 3, Tour de Suisse
3rd, Amstel Gold Race
2000
1st, HEW Cyclassics
1st, Stage 4, Volta a Catalunya
2002
3rd, Clásica de San Sebastián
2007
1st, Overall, Tour of Qinghai Lake

External links

Living people
Cyclists from the Metropolitan City of Milan
1970 births
Italian male cyclists
Italian Giro d'Italia stage winners
Tour de Suisse stage winners